The Slovakia women's national under-20 basketball team is a national basketball team of Slovakia, administered by the Slovak Basketball Association. It represents the country in women's international under-20 basketball competitions.

FIBA U20 Women's European Championship participations

See also
Slovakia women's national basketball team
Slovakia women's national under-19 basketball team

References

External links
Archived records of Slovakia team participations

Basketball in Slovakia
Basketball
Women's national under-20 basketball teams